Nicolas Navarro may refer to:
 Nicolás Navarro (Argentine footballer) (born 1985), Argentine football goalkeeper
 Nicolás Navarro (Mexican footballer) (born 1963), Mexican football goalkeeper
 Nicolas Navarro (racing driver), French racing driver in events such as the 2008 Speedcar Series
 Nicolas Navarro (runner) (born 1991), French long-distance runner